Events in the year 1864 in Belgium.

Incumbents
Monarch: Leopold I
Head of government: Charles Rogier

Events
Belgian State Railways Type 1 taken into use

February
 4 February – Belgian Red Cross founded

April
 Charles Baudelaire moves to Brussels. 

May
 21 May – Father Damien ordained in Honolulu
 23 May – Provincial elections
 29 May – Princess Charlotte lands in Mexico to become Empress as consort of Maximilian I of Mexico

July
 11 July – Federation of Catholic Circles and Conservative Associations formed (later to become the more formalised Catholic Party)

August
 11 August – 1864 Belgian general election, won by Liberal Party
 29 August – Catholic Congress in Mechelen opens (to 3 September)

September
 Exhibition of medieval, Renaissance and contemporary religious art in Mechelen.

October
 16 October – Belgian Legion embark for Mexico to take part in the Second French intervention in Mexico

Sports
 Royal Athletics Association Ghent founded

Publications
Periodicals
Annales du bibliophile belge begins publication.
Analectes pour servir à l'histoire ecclésiastique de la Belgique begins publication, edited by Mgr. De Ram.
Antwerpsch Archievenblad begins publication.
Bulletins de l'Académie royale des sciences, des lettres et des beaux-arts de Belgique, Volume 17 (Brussels, M. Hayez).
 Collection de précis historiques, vol. 13, edited by Edouard Terwecoren S.J.

Pamphlets
 Réflexions sur les conséquences probables de l'expédition mexicaine (Brussels).

Literary works
 Auguste Louwage, Les trois soeurs Flamandes. Gand, Bruges, Anvers: trilogie nationale (Ghent, F. & E. Gyselynck).

Scholarly editions
 Pierre Joseph Le Boucq, Histoire des troubles advenues à Valenciennes à cause des hérésies, 1562-1579, edited by A.-P.-L. de Robaulx de Soumoy (Brussels, Ghent and Leipzig).

Births
 11 January – Henri Daco, painter (died 1932)
 26 March – Louis Reckelbus, painter (died 1958)
 21 May – Princess Stéphanie of Belgium (died 1945)
 22 May – Josue Dupon, sculptor (died 1935)
 10 October – Blanche Arral, soprano (died 1945)
 22 October – Eugène Laermans, painter (died 1940)
 2 November – Oscar Roels, composer (died 1938)
 28 November – Léon van Hout, musician (died 1945)

Deaths
 19 February – Ferdinand Lecouvet (born 1827), bibliographer.
 23 March – Jean-Baptiste Malou (born 1806), bishop
 5 April – Louis Roelandt (born 1786), architect
 27 May – Léandre Desmaisières (born 1794), politician
 1 September – Jean Kickx (born 1803), botanist
 2 October – Louis-Joseph Delebecque (born 1798), bishop of Ghent

References

 
Belgium
Years of the 19th century in Belgium
1860s in Belgium
Belgium